"Castaway" is a song by New Zealand group Mi-Sex, released in May 1982. The song peaked at number 23 in Australia.

Track listings
Australia/New Zealand 7" (BA 222930)
 "Castaway" 	
 "Young Maniacs"

North America 7" (Epic – 34-04419)
 "Castaway" - 3:25
 "Don't Look Back in Anger" - 3:16

Charts

References

New Zealand songs
Mi-Sex songs
1982 singles
1982 songs
CBS Records singles